The Glenn Davis Army Award is given annually to the player of the West team at the U.S. Army All-American Bowl, who best epitomizes the US Army's high standards of excellence in community service, education, and athletic excellence. The award is named after Glenn Woodward Davis, the 1946 Heisman Trophy winner.

Past winners

References
US Army All-American Bowl Awards

High school football trophies and awards in the United States